Edward Higgs (died 27 July 1950) was a British tennis player.

Tennis career
Higgs grew up Hertfordshire and studied at Haileybury, before competing on the tennis circuit in the 1920s. He won the British Covered Court Championships in 1927, beating Gordon Crole-Rees in the final. His best run at Wimbledon came in 1927 when he was beaten in the third round by Jean Borotra in five sets. He made the Wimbledon men's doubles quarter-finals twice. A Davis Cup player for Great Britain in 1927 and 1928, Higgs won eight singles rubbers and lost four.

Personal life
In 1931, Higgs was married to Enid Joyce Sherring, the daughter of an Indian civil servant.

Higgs died in 1950 at his Lemsford home, aged 48. At the time of his death he was a member of the British selection committee for the Davis Cup and Wightman Cup.

See also
List of Great Britain Davis Cup team representatives

References

External links
 
 
 

Year of birth missing
1950 deaths
British male tennis players
English male tennis players
Tennis people from Hertfordshire
People educated at Haileybury and Imperial Service College